Vitales is an order of flowering plants. In the APG III system (2009) onwards, the family Vitaceae is placed in its own order, Vitales. Molecular phylogenetic studies place the Vitales as the most basal clade in the rosids. The anthophytes are a grouping of plant taxa bearing flower-like reproductive structures. They were formerly thought to be a clade comprising plants bearing flower-like structures.  The group contained the angiosperms - the extant flowering plants, such as roses and grasses - as well as the Gnetales and the extinct Bennettitales.

23,420 species of vascular plant have been recorded in South Africa, making it the sixth most species-rich country in the world and the most species-rich country on the African continent. Of these, 153 species are considered to be threatened. Nine biomes have been described in South Africa: Fynbos, Succulent Karoo, desert, Nama Karoo, grassland, savanna, Albany thickets, the Indian Ocean coastal belt, and forests.

The 2018 South African National Biodiversity Institute's National Biodiversity Assessment plant checklist lists 35,130 taxa in the phyla Anthocerotophyta (hornworts (6)), Anthophyta (flowering plants (33534)), Bryophyta (mosses (685)), Cycadophyta (cycads (42)), Lycopodiophyta (Lycophytes(45)), Marchantiophyta (liverworts (376)), Pinophyta (conifers (33)), and Pteridophyta (cryptogams (408)).

One family is represented in the literature. Listed taxa include species, subspecies, varieties, and forms as recorded, some of which have subsequently been allocated to other taxa as synonyms, in which cases the accepted taxon is appended to the listing. Multiple entries under alternative names reflect taxonomic revision over time.

Vitaceae
Family: Vitaceae,

Ampelocissus
Genus Ampelocissus:
 Ampelocissus obtusata (Welw. ex Baker) Planch. indigenous
 Ampelocissus obtusata (Welw. ex Baker) Planch. subsp. kirkiana (Planch.) Wild & R.B.Drumm. indigenous

Cayratia
Genus Cayratia:
 Cayratia gracilis (Guill. & Perr.) Suess. indigenous

Cissus
Genus Cissus:
 Cissus cactiformis Gilg, indigenous
 Cissus cornifolia (Baker) Planch. indigenous
 Cissus cussonioides Schinz, endemic
 Cissus diversilobata C.A.Sm. indigenous
 Cissus fragilis E.Mey. ex Kunth, endemic
 Cissus quadrangularis L. indigenous
 Cissus quadrangularis L. var. quadrangularis, indigenous
 Cissus rotundifolia (Forssk.) Vahl, indigenous
 Cissus rotundifolia (Forssk.) Vahl var. rotundifolia, indigenous

Cyphostemma 
Genus Cyphostemma :
 Cyphostemma anatomicum (C.A.Sm.) Wild & R.B.Drumm. endemic
 Cyphostemma barbosae Wild & R.B.Drumm. indigenous
 Cyphostemma buchananii (Planch.) Desc. ex Wild & R.B.Drumm. indigenous
 Cyphostemma cirrhosum (Thunb.) Desc. ex Wild & R.B.Drumm. indigenous
 Cyphostemma cirrhosum (Thunb.) Desc. ex Wild & R.B.Drumm. subsp. cirrhosum, indigenous
 Cyphostemma cirrhosum (Thunb.) Desc. ex Wild & R.B.Drumm. subsp. transvaalense (Szyszyl.) Wild & R.B, indigenous
 Cyphostemma dasypleurum (C.A.Sm.) J.J.M.van der Merwe, endemic
 Cyphostemma flaviflorum (Sprague) Desc. indigenous
 Cyphostemma hardyi Retief, endemic
 Cyphostemma hereroense (Schinz) Desc. ex Wild & R.B.Drumm. indigenous
 Cyphostemma hispidiflorum (C.A.Sm.) J.J.M.van der Merwe, endemic
 Cyphostemma humile (N.E.Br.) Desc. ex Wild & R.B.Drumm. indigenous
 Cyphostemma humile (N.E.Br.) Desc. ex Wild & R.B.Drumm. subsp. dolichopus (C.A.Sm.) Wild & R.B.Drumm, indigenous
 Cyphostemma humile (N.E.Br.) Desc. ex Wild & R.B.Drumm. subsp. humile, indigenous
 Cyphostemma hypoleucum (Harv.) Desc. ex Wild & R.B.Drumm. indigenous
 Cyphostemma lanigerum (Harv.) Desc. ex Wild & R.B.Drumm. indigenous
 Cyphostemma natalitium (Szyszyl.) J.J.M.van der Merwe, endemic
 Cyphostemma oleraceum (Bolus) J.J.M.van der Merwe, endemic
 Cyphostemma paucidentatum (Klotzsch) Desc. ex Wild & R.B.Drumm. indigenous
 Cyphostemma puberulum (C.A.Sm.) Wild & R.B.Drumm. indigenous
 Cyphostemma quinatum (Dryand.) Desc. ex Wild & R.B.Drumm. indigenous
 Cyphostemma rubroglandulosum Retief & A.E.van Wyk, endemic
 Cyphostemma sandersonii (Harv.) Desc. indigenous
 Cyphostemma schlechteri (Gilg & M.Brandt) Desc. ex Wild & R.B.Drumm. indigenous
 Cyphostemma segmentatum (C.A.Sm.) J.J.M.van der Merwe, indigenous
 Cyphostemma simulans (C.A.Sm.) Wild & R.B.Drumm. indigenous
 Cyphostemma spinosopilosum (Gilg & M.Brandt) Desc. indigenous
 Cyphostemma subciliatum (Baker) Desc. ex Wild & R.B.Drumm. indigenous
 Cyphostemma sulcatum (C.A.Sm.) J.J.M.van der Merwe, endemic
 Cyphostemma woodii (Gilg & M.Brandt) Desc. indigenous

Rhoicissus
Genus Rhoicissus:
 Rhoicissus digitata (L.f.) Gilg & M.Brandt, indigenous
 Rhoicissus kougabergensis Retief & Van Jaarsv. endemic
 Rhoicissus laetans Retief, endemic
 Rhoicissus microphylla (Turcz.) Gilg & M.Brandt, endemic
 Rhoicissus revoilii Planch. indigenous
 Rhoicissus rhomboidea (E.Mey. ex Harv.) Planch. indigenous
 Rhoicissus sekhukhuniensis Retief, Siebert & A.E.van Wyk, endemic
 Rhoicissus sessilifolia Retief, endemic
 Rhoicissus tomentosa (Lam.) Wild & R.B.Drumm. indigenous
 Rhoicissus tridentata (L.f.) Wild & R.B.Drumm. indigenous
 Rhoicissus tridentata (L.f.) Wild & R.B.Drumm. subsp. cuneifolia (Eckl. & Zeyh.) Urton, indigenous
 Rhoicissus tridentata (L.f.) Wild & R.B.Drumm. subsp. tridentata, endemic

References

South African plant biodiversity lists
Vitaceae